Alfred Rudolph Waud (October 2, 1828 – April 6, 1891) was an American artist and illustrator, born in London, England. He is most notable for the sketches he made as an artist correspondent during the American Civil War.

Early life

Waud was christened Alfred Robert Waud but used Rhudolph as a middle name while living in America. He was the eldest son of Alfred Waud Sr., born London 1796. Waud's mother was Mary (née) Fitz-John, born 1806 in Lougher, near Swansea, South Wales. Waud had four siblings: Mary Pricilla, born 1829, William born 1831, Julia, born 1834, and Josephine, born 1840; the last two sisters were both spinsters, but Mary Pricilla married Augustus Cory Scoles in London in 1862. Waud sailed from London aboard the sailing ship Hendrik Hudson in 1850 for New York. His brother William followed in 1855 aboard the sailing ship Hermann, also for New York. Waud was naturalized as an American citizen on January 10, 1870. He married Mary Gertrude Jewell from New York circa 1855 or 1856. They lived in Orange, New Jersey, where they raised their family.

Before immigration, Alfred Waud had entered the Government School of Design at Somerset House, London, with the intention of becoming a marine painter. This did not come to fruition, but as a student, he also worked as a painter of theatrical scenery. He intended to pursue that work in the United States, when he immigrated in 1850, seeking employment with actor and playwright John Brougham. In the 1850s, he worked variously as an illustrator for a Boston periodical, the Carpet-Bag, and provided illustrations for books such as Hunter's Panoramic Guide from Niagara to Quebec (1857).

Civil War years

The period during the American Civil War was a time when all images in a publication had to be hand drawn and engraved by skilled artists. Photography existed but there was no way to transfer a photograph to a printing plate since this was well before the advent of the halftone process for printing photographs. Photographic equipment was too cumbersome and exposure times were too slow to be used on the battlefield. An artist such as Waud would do detailed sketches in the field, which were then rushed by courier back to the main office of the newspaper they were working for. There a staff of engravers would use the sketches to create engravings on blocks of boxwood. Since the blocks were about 4 inches across they would have to be composited together to make one large illustration. The wood engraving was then copied via the electrotype process which produced a metal printing plate for publication.

In 1860, Alfred Waud became an illustrator or "special artist" (a full-time paid staff artist) for the New York Illustrated News. In April 1861, the newspaper assigned Waud to cover the Army of the Potomac, Virginia's main Union army. He first illustrated General Winfield Scott in Washington, D.C., and then entered the field to render the First Battle of Bull Run in July. Waud followed a Union expedition to Cape Hatteras, North Carolina the next month and witnessed the Battle of Hatteras Inlet Batteries. That autumn, he sketched army activity in the Tidewater region of Virginia. Waud joined Harper's Weekly toward the end of 1861, continuing to cover the war. In 1864 Alfred's brother, William Waud (who up to that time had been working with "Frank Leslie's Illustrated Newspaper"), joined Alfred on the staff of Harper's and they worked together during the Petersburg Campaign.

Alfred Waud attended every battle of the Army of the Potomac between the First Battle of Bull Run in 1861 and the Siege of Petersburg in 1865.  Alfred was one of only two artists present at the Battle of Gettysburg. His depiction of Pickett's Charge is thought to be the only visual account by an eyewitness.

Post Civil War work
Waud continued to be a prolific illustrator, doing numerous illustrations for Harper's Weekly and other prominent publications, achieving his greatest fame in his post-War work.

Waud died in 1891 in Marietta, Georgia, while touring battlefields of the South.

Artwork

Collections
 Library of Congress

Notes

References
 David Meschutt. "Waud, Alfred R."; American National Biography Online (subscription only), October 2002 Update.
 Our Special Artist by Frederic E. Ray, The Viking Press, 1974

External links

 
 
 Bohemian Brigade — Alfred Rudolph Waud — "Our Special Artists" by Michael Farnsley, Bohemianbrigade.com
 AskArt.com - Alfred Rudolf Waud  (1828–1891).
 
 Alfred R. Waud Papers at The Historic New Orleans Collection (THNOC)
 Alfred Waud Sketchbook Number One (1847) via Louisiana Digital Library and THNOC

1828 births
1891 deaths
American magazine illustrators
English emigrants to the United States
Artists from London
People of New York (state) in the American Civil War
19th-century war artists
American war artists
War correspondents of the American Civil War